Resurrecting Ravana is an original novel based on the U.S. television series Buffy the Vampire Slayer. Tagline: "A dark evil is rising".

Plot summary

It's midterm exam time at Sunnydale High School and tensions are rising high in the usual group. Particularly between Buffy and Willow who seem to have some sort of unspoken dislike of the other. Meanwhile, horrible murders have been occurring throughout Sunnydale; two close friends end up dead, one kills the other and then the murderer ends up as a pile of bones. The murders also coincide with the arrival of a large group of demons called the Rakshasa who seem to have a sort of wicked control over their victims. As Buffy and Willow become more and more violent towards each other, Giles does some research which indicates that the Rakshasa are in town to help with the resurrection on an ancient Hindu demon called Ravana. And when Giles spots Ethan Rayne in town, he knows that something chaotic is at hand.

Characters include: Buffy, Joyce, Giles, Xander, Angel, Cordelia, Willow, Oz, and Ethan Rayne. Cordelia's web page in the book is www.shrew.com

Continuity

Supposed to be set late in Buffy season 3.

Canonical issues

Buffy novels such as this one are not usually considered by fans as canonical. Some fans consider them stories from the imaginations of authors and artists, while other fans consider them as taking place in an alternative fictional reality. However unlike fan fiction, overviews summarising their story, written early in the writing process, were 'approved' by both Fox and Joss Whedon (or his office), and the books were therefore later published as officially Buffy merchandise.

External links

Reviews
Litefoot1969.bravepages.com - Review of this book by Litefoot
Teen-books.com - Reviews of this book
Nika-summers.com - Review of this book by Nika Summers
Shadowcat.name - Review of this book

2000 American novels
Books based on Buffy the Vampire Slayer
Hindu mythology in popular culture